Wölfli is a Swiss surname that may refer to:

 Adolf Wölfli (1864-1930), Swiss artist
 Marco Wölfli (b. 1982), Swiss football player
 Richard Wolfli (b. 1966), Oil & Gas Executive
 James Wolfli (b. 1975), Plastic & Reconstructive Surgeon

Swiss-German surnames